The  or simply J2 is the second division of the  and the second level of the Japanese association football league system. The top tier is represented by the J1 League. Until the 2014 season it was named the J.League Division 2.

Second-tier club football has existed in Japan since 1972; however, it was only professionalized during the 1999 season with ten clubs. The league took one relegating club from the top division and nine clubs from the second-tier semi-professional former Japan Football League to create the J2 League. The remaining seven clubs in the Japan Football League, the newly formed Yokohama FC, and one promoting club from the Regional Leagues, formed the nine-club Japan Football League, then the third tier of Japanese football. The third tier is now represented by the J3 League.

History

Phases of Japanese second-tier association football

Amateur era (until 1999)
A national second tier of Japanese association football was first established in 1972, when the Japan Soccer League formed a Second Division. Among the founding 10 clubs, 5 later competed in the J.League: Toyota Motors (inaugural champions), Yomiuri, Fujitsu, Kyoto Shiko Club and Kofu Club. 
The new division consisted of 10 clubs, like the First Division, and initially required both the champions and runners-up teams to play off a promotion/relegation series of test matches against the top flight's bottom clubs. The requirement was abolished for the champions in 1980, and for the runners-up in 1984.

Prior to 1977, the way for clubs to gain access to the Second Division was by making the finals of the All Japan Senior Football Championship and then playing off in their own promotion/relegation series against the second tier's bottom clubs.  After 1977, the new Regional Football League Competition served as provider of aspiring League clubs. In 1985, the Second Division increased to 12 clubs and in 1986, the number reached 16.  Until 1989, the table was divided into East and West groups, depending on geographical location; after that year and until 1992 the table was unified.

In 1992, following the formation of the J.League, the JSL Second Division was renamed the (former) Japan Football League.  The league was divided into two hierarchical, unequal divisions of 10 clubs each. In 1994, the JFL was again reunified into a single division. As the J.League expanded in numbers, the need for another second tier with promotion and relegation arose, as the number of clubs which wanted to become professional increased (particularly in the case of Shonan Bellmare, Kashiwa Reysol, Cerezo Osaka and Júbilo Iwata, who had been JSL First Division champions but had not been chosen for the inaugural J.League season).

Professionalization era (1999–2004)
The infrastructure of the league was heavily changed in 1999. The new division acquired nine clubs from the semi-professional JFL and one relegated club from J.League to create a two-division system, both being the professional leagues. The top flight became the J.League Division 1 (J1) with 16 clubs while J.League Division 2 (J2) was launched with ten clubs in 1999. The second-tier (former) Japan Football League became the third-tier Japan Football League at that time.

The criteria for becoming a J2 club were not as strict as those for the top division.  This allowed smaller cities and towns to maintain a club successfully without investing as much as clubs in J1. In fact, clubs like Mito HollyHock only draw an average of 3,000 fans a game and receive minimal sponsorship, yet still field fairly competitive teams in J2.

Clubs in J2 took time to build their teams for J1 promotion, as they also tried to gradually improve their youth systems, their home stadium, their financial status, and their relationship with their hometown. Clubs such as Oita Trinita, Albirex Niigata, Kawasaki Frontale, and Ventforet Kofu accomplished this successfully. All these clubs originally started as J2 in 1999 and were comparatively small, but they eventually earned J1 promotion, in 2002, 2003, 2004, and 2005 respectively. Even though Kofu and Ōita were later relegated back to Division 2, they are well-established association football clubs, managing to average 10,000 fans per game.

The league also began to follow European game formats, as time went on. In the first three seasons (1999–2001), games were played with extra time for regular league matches if there was no winner at end of the regulation. The extra time was abolished in 2002, and the league adopted the standard 3-1-0 points system.

Early expansion era (2004–2009)
Two Japan Football League clubs, Mito HollyHock and Yokohama FC joined the J2 League in the 2000 and 2001 seasons. Mito initially tried in the 1999 season, but failed, having better luck the following year. On the other hand, Yokohama FC was formed by the fans of Yokohama Flügels, who went defunct after the merger with Yokohama F. Marinos on 1 January 1999. In essence, these two clubs could and should have joined the league in the inaugural year with the original ten clubs, and it was inevitable that they were eventually accepted by the league.

However, besides these two clubs, it seemed that there was no interest from the lower-level clubs; the second division did not see any further expansion for a few seasons. In 2004, however, two clubs showed interest as Thespa Kusatsu and Tokushima Vortis were accepted to the league. Two years later, in the 2006 season, Ehime FC followed in their footsteps. It turned out that many clubs were aiming for membership at the professional level.  However, in the early 2000s, these clubs were still in the regional leagues, and it took them three to four years to even eye professionalism.

Clearly, the concept of second-tier professional association football – the fact that clubs can compete at the professional level with low budgets, was something that attracted many amateur clubs across the Japanese nation. At the beginning of the 2006 season, the league took a survey to determine the number of non-league clubs interested in joining the professional league. The results showed that about 40 to 60 clubs in Japan had plans to professionalize over the next 30 years. From the league's perspective, the J.League 'Hundred Year Vision' from the late 90s has been moving in a positive direction.

In light of this, league management formed a committee and looked at two practical options for further expansion – either expand the second division or form a third division. In other words, the league had a choice between letting the non-league clubs achieve the J2 standard, or forming a third division with non-league clubs, where these clubs can prepare for J2. After conducting several case studies, the committee made a professional assessment that it was in the best interest of the league to expand the J2 to 22 clubs rather than form a third division.  Several reasons led the committee to this decision: 
 The Japan Football League, then the third tier in the Japanese football league system, was already serving the purpose of preparing the non-league clubs.
 At the time, most non-league clubs interested in professionalism were still in the regional or prefectural leagues, two to four levels below J2.
 Twenty-two clubs is the perfect number for the J2 league, as it allows enough home games for annual revenue, while keeping the competition a fair double-round-robin format.
 Most European leagues have similar association football pyramids, where there are more clubs in 2nd and 3rd-tier leagues than in the top flight.

The committee also reintroduced Associate Membership System in the 2006 season.  This allowed the committee to identify interested non-league clubs and provide necessary resources to them.  The membership was exclusively given to non-league clubs that had intentions of joining the J.League, while meeting most of the criteria for J2 promotion.  Several clubs in the Japan Football League and Regional Leagues have applied for and received membership.  Associate members finishing in the top 4 of the JFL were promoted to J2. Following the promotion of Ehime FC, six more clubs joined J2 League through this system.

As the number of clubs increased, the league format changed from a quadruple round-robin to a triple round-robin format. This was adopted during the 2008 season with 15 clubs and the 2009 season with 18 clubs.  In 2009, the J2 league also saw an increase in promotion slots to three, to accommodate the eighteen-club league.  As a result, the Promotion/relegation Series, which allowed the third-place J2 clubs to fight for J1 slots for the following season, was abolished, after its introduction in the 2004 season.

Introduction of double round-robin (2010–2011)
When the league reached 19 clubs in the 2010 season, the J2 League adopted the double round-robin format.  The league continued to expand to 22 clubs, and until then there was no relegation to the Japan Football League. In the next few seasons, the maximum number of clubs that could be promoted to J2 was decided by taking the difference of twenty-two minus the number of clubs in J2.

End of expansion and J2 Playoffs (2012–present)
When the league reached 22 clubs, two new regulations were introduced.  Only the top two clubs earn automatic promotion, while clubs from 3rd to 6th entered playoffs for the final third promotion slot, as in the English Football League Championship, Serie B, or Segunda División. 
However, the rules will be heavily slanted to favor those with higher league placement:
 The team third in the standings will face the sixth place team, and the fourth place team will face the fifth, as in the European leagues; however, unlike these leagues, the round will be only one match, at the home side of the higher placed team.
 The winners of the two matches meet at the home side of the higher placed team, or potentially at a neutral venue (likely Tokyo National Stadium). The winner of this match is promoted to J1.
 In all matches, in case of a draw after regulation time, the team that ended the season with the higher placement in the league table will be considered the winner, so there will be no extra time and/or penalty shootout.
 If teams ineligible for promotion finished above sixth, they will not be allowed to participate in the playoffs. Instead, the highest ranked team(s) will receive byes.

Also starting in 2012, at most two clubs can be relegated to the lower tier (for 2012 season only, Japan Football League; from 2013, J3 League), depending on how that league finished.

Current plans (2013–present)
Starting in 2013, a club licensing system was implemented. Clubs failing to fulfill this licensing requirement can be relegated to the third tier, regardless of their league position. The third-tier league, J3 League, was established in 2014, targeting teams having ambitions to reach the J.League. The structure of J2 is likely to remain stable.

Since 2017, two clubs are promoted from and relegated to J3 and starting in 2018, the J2 playoffs winner plays against the 16th-placed J1 club after discussions were held during the prior season. Until 2022, if the J2 playoff winner prevailed, the club was promoted, with the J1 club being relegated, otherwise the J1 club could retain its position in J1 with the promotion failure of the J2 club.

From the 2023 season onwards, the J2 playoff winner will be directly promoted to the J1, without the need to play a match against a J1 League team in order to be promoted. From 2024, the three bottom-placed teams will be automatically relegated to J3.

Timeline

Stance in the Japanese football pyramid 

Since the inception of the second division in 1999, promotion and relegation follow a pattern similar to European leagues, where the two bottom clubs of J1 and the top two clubs of J2 are guaranteed to move. From the 2004 to the 2008 season, the third-place J2 club entered a Promotion/relegation Series against the sixteenth-place J1 club, with the winner playing in the top flight in the following year. Starting after the 2009 season, the top three J2 clubs received J1 promotion by default, replacing three relegated bottom J1 clubs.  However, promotion or the right to play the now-defunct pro/rele series relied on the J2 clubs meeting the requirements for J1 franchise status set by the league. This was not a hindrance, in fact, as no club has been denied promotion due to not meeting the J1 criteria.

The J3 League is currently the third level in the association football system, supplanting the Japan Football League (JFL) which is now one step lower in the system. Being a professional league, the J.League allows only certain clubs from J3 to be promoted. In 2000, 2001, and 2006 the JFL league champions was promoted to J2; in 2005 two teams were promoted. From 2007, the league requires J.League Associate Membership and at least a fourth-place finish in JFL (J3 from 2013) to be promoted to J2. Currently, there are two relegations from J2 to J3. Since 1999, a total of sixteen clubs from JFL (later J3) have been promoted to J2, two of which were expanded into J1. Currently, J1 has 18 clubs and J2 has 22 clubs. Division two expanded to 22 clubs from 20; regular promotion and relegation is in place.

Since its inception in 1999, the format of J2 has been consistent. Clubs played a quadruple round-robin (two home and away) format during the 1999 to 2007 seasons. To accommodate the ongoing expansion process, a triple round-robin format was implemented during the 2008 and 2009 seasons. Until the 2001 season, the clubs played extra time if they were tied after regulation and the clubs received three points for a regulation win, two points for an extra time win, one point for a draw, and no points for a loss (there were no penalties). However, starting in 2002, the league abolished extra time and set the points system to the standard three-one-nil system.

The number of clubs reached 19 in 2010 and the league format was changed to a double round-robin one. The number of teams in the league increased to 20 in 2011 and 22 in 2012, where it had remained since then until the 2023 season. From 2024, the number of teams in each professional league will be levelled to 20.

Crest

2023 season

League format 

Twenty-two clubs play in double round-robin format, a total of 42 games each. A club receives three points for a win, one point for a tie, and no points for a loss. The clubs are ranked by points, and tie breakers are, in the following order: 
 Goal difference
 Goals scored
 Head-to-head results
 Disciplinary points
A draw would be conducted, if necessary. However, if two clubs are tied at first place, both clubs will be declared champions. Two top clubs will be directly promoted to J1, and the third spot will be decided in the playoff series among clubs placed third to sixth. The team that wins this series will also be promoted for the next J1 season. Note that in order to participate in the playoffs a club must possess a J1 license; if one or more clubs fail to do so, they are not allowed in the playoffs and will not be replaced by other clubs.

The relegation to the lower tier J3 League will depend on the number and final standings of promotion-eligible clubs that possess a J2 license. Up to two clubs can be exchanged between two leagues, with direct promotion/relegation between the two bottom-place J2 teams (21st and 22nd) and top two J3 teams (champion and runner-up). If one or both J3 promotion candidates fail to obtain a J2 license, they will not be allowed to promote and J2 relegation spots will be cut accordingly.

Prize money
 First place: 20,000,000 yen
 Second place: 10,000,000 yen
 Third place: 5,000,000 yen

Participating clubs (2023)

Gray background denotes club was most recently relegated/demoted from Division 1.
Pink background denotes club was most recently promoted from J3 League.
"Year joined" is the year the club joined the J.League (Division 2 unless otherwise indicated).
"First season in D2", "Seasons in D2", and "Last spell in D2" take into account all past incarnations of second-tier football: the second division of the Japan Soccer League and the former Japan Football League.
"Last spell in top flight" includes seasons in the old Japan Soccer League First Division.

Stadiums (2023) 

Primary venues used in the J2 League:

Former clubs

Pink background denotes clubs that were most recently promoted to J1 League.
Gray background denotes club that was most recently relegated to J3 League.
"Year joined" is the year the club joined the J.League (Division 2 unless otherwise indicated).
"First season in D2", "Seasons in D2", and "Last Spell in D2" take into account all past incarnations of second-tier football: the second division of the Japan Soccer League and the former Japan Football League

Champions and promotion history 

The top two clubs receive promotion. From the 2004 season to the 2008 season, the third place club played the Promotion/relegation Series against the 16th-place club in J1. From the 2009 to the 2011 season, the third place club was promoted by default. From 2012 to 2017 and 2023 onwards, the third promotion place is determined by a playoff between the 3rd to 6th actual places. From 2018 to 2019 and 2022, the playoff winners faced off against the 16th place in J1.

* Bold designates the promoted club† Lost the Promotion/relegation Series or entry playoff‡ Won the Promotion/relegation Series or entry playoff and got promoted

Most successful clubs
Clubs in bold compete in J2 as of the 2023 season.

Promotion playoff results

Results

Relegation history
Upon the formation of the second division, the league had not implemented any relegation mechanism between J2 and the (formerly) third tier Japan Football League, and the exchange between divisions worked one-way only. After years of gradual expansion, the division has reached its planned capacity of 22 teams, therefore allowing J.League to start relegating bottom-place teams to JFL. Machida Zelvia set the unhappy milestone in 2012, becoming the very first team to be relegated from J2 (and the only team ever to be relegated to JFL). Next year the professional J3 League was formed, making relegation between second and third tiers a permanent establishment.

The rules for exchange between J2 and J3 are the following from 2017 to 2019, and 2022 to 2023: the 21st and 22nd-place J2 teams are relegated immediately and are replaced by the J3 champion and runner-up. If one or both J3 contenders do not possess J2 licenses, they are not allowed to be promoted, and the relegation spots for J2 sides are reduced accordingly.

No teams descended from J1 or to J3 after the 2020 season due to the COVID-19 pandemic in Japan and its effects. Instead, two promotions and four relegations were in place for the 2021 season, keeping the number of J2 teams at 22. Three relegations to J3 will be from 2024 onwards.

* Bold designates relegated clubs† Won the playoff against JFL or J3 team‡ Lost the playoff series to JFL or J3 team and was relegated

Players and managers

Managers
 List of J.League managers

Top scorers

See also

 Sport in Japan
 Football in Japan
 Women's football in Japan
 Japan Football Association (JFA)

 Soccer/Football
 League system
 Japanese association football league system
 J.League
 J1 League (Tier 1)
 J2 League (Tier 2)
 J3 League (Tier 3)
 Japan Football League (JFL) (Tier 4)
 Regional Champions League (Promotion playoffs to JFL)
 Regional Leagues (Tier 5/6)

 Domestic cup
 Fujifilm Super Cup (Super Cup)
 Emperor's Cup (National Cup)
 J.League YBC Levain Cup (League Cup)

 Futsal
 F.League
 F1 League (Tier 1)
 F2 League (Tier 2)
 JFA Futsal Championship (National Cup)
 F.League Ocean Cup (League Cup)

 Beach soccer
 Beach Soccer Championship (National Cup)

References

External links
 Official website, JLeague.jp 
  

 
2
2
1999 establishments in Japan
Japan
Sports leagues established in 1999
Summer association football leagues
Professional sports leagues in Japan